Bishopsbourne (known informally as "The Bourne") is a rural locality in the local government area (LGA) of Northern Midlands in the Central LGA region of Tasmania. The 2016 census has a population of 136 for the state suburb of Bishopsbourne.
It is a farming community  and has a church, graveyard and recreation ground. Nearby towns include Carrick, Bracknell and Longford all of which are regarded as lesser towns. Almost all the houses and farms are located on Bishopsbourne Road and there are a few back roads.
There has been increased activity of development in recent years, though none of it has been commercial.

Bishopsbourne has a cricket team that has been playing in the local competition for about 70 years.

History 
Bishopsbourne was gazetted as a locality in 1966.

Bishopsbourne Post Office opened on 31 December 1846 and closed in 1976.

St Wilfrid's Theological College, Cressy was located near Bishopsbourne.

Geography
The Liffey River forms the western boundary.

Road infrastructure
Route C513 (Liffey Road / Bishopsbourne Road) passes through from south to north. Route C518 (an extension of Bishopsbourne Road) starts at an intersection with C513 and runs east until it exits.

References

Towns in Tasmania
Localities of Northern Midlands Council